Edward Harleston (December 25, 1794 – February 11, 1871) was an American planter and politician.

Harleston, the son of Edward and Annabella (Moultrie) Harleston, was born in Charleston, S. C. on December 25, 1794. He died on February 11, 1871, when he was 76.

Harleston graduated from Yale College in 1815.  Throughout most of his life, he was a planter of rice and cotton. He served in the South Carolina State Legislature several years. He married Ann Isabella Huger, who survived him, on January 26, 1826.

External links
 

1794 births
1826 deaths
Yale College alumni
Members of the South Carolina General Assembly
American planters
Politicians from Charleston, South Carolina
19th-century American politicians